Male is an uninhabited island in the Maldives.

It is located near a coral reef and has a sandy beach, with thick palm tree vegetation in its interior.  The island is owned by Vermilion International, a company based in the Maldives.

External links
Commercial website describing island, from the island's owners

Uninhabited islands of the Maldives